Haider Ali Khan is a Pakistani politician from Pakistan Tehreek-e-Insaf who had been a member of the National Assembly of Pakistan, from August 2018 till January 2023after winning elections from NA-2 (Swat-I). Previously, he was a Member of the Provincial Assembly of Khyber Pakhtunkhwa from 2008 to 2013 and again from April 2014 to May 2018.

Early life and education
He was born on 17 March 1964 in Swat District, Pakistan. He completed his Intermediate Education (F.Sc.) from Abbottabad Public School. He received the degree of Bachelor of Medicine, and Bachelor of Surgery (MBBS) from Khyber Medical University in 1992.

Political career
Khan was elected to the Provincial Assembly of Khyber Pakhtunkhwa as a candidate of Awami National Party (ANP) from Constituency PF-86 (Swat-VII) in 2008 Pakistani general election. He received 8,064 votes and defeated Qaimos Khan, a candidate of Pakistan Muslim League (Q) (PML-Q).

He ran for the seat of the Provincial Assembly of Khyber Pakhtunkhwa as a candidate of ANP from Constituency PK-86 (Swat-VII) in 2013 Pakistani general election but was unsuccessful. He received 10,028 votes and lost the seat to Qaimos Khan, a candidate of Pakistan Muslim League (N) (PML-N).

In February 2014, he quit ANP and joined Pakistan Tehreek-e-Insaf (PTI).

He was re-elected to the Provincial Assembly of Khyber Pakhtunkhwa as a candidate of PTI from Constituency PK-86 (Swat-VII) in by-polls held in April 2014. He received 17,420 votes and defeated Sardar Khan, a candidate of PML-N.

He was elected to the National Assembly of Pakistan as a candidate of PTI from Constituency NA-2 (Swat-I) in 2018 Pakistani general election.

Electoral history

2018

References

1964 births
Living people
Pashtun people
Khyber Pakhtunkhwa MPAs 2013–2018
People from Swat District
Pakistan Tehreek-e-Insaf MNAs
Pakistani MNAs 2018–2023